The New Nintendo 2DS XL (branded as New Nintendo 2DS LL in Japan) is a handheld game console produced by Nintendo. It is the sixth and final system in the Nintendo 3DS family of handheld consoles, and was released in Australia and New Zealand on 15 June 2017, in Japan and South Korea on 13 July 2017, and in North America and Europe on 28 July 2017.

Serving as a companion to the Nintendo 2DS, the New Nintendo 2DS XL is based on the hardware of the New Nintendo 3DS, but with no autostereoscopic 3D display, its microphone and camera moved to the hinge, and speakers moved to the lower half of the device. As with the New Nintendo 3DS, it has an updated processor, an analog pointing stick and additional shoulder triggers, and near-field communications (NFC) support for Amiibo. According to Nintendo Support, the battery of the console lasts 3.5 to 5.5 hours when playing 3DS games, 7 to 9 hours when playing DS games, and around 3 days when in sleep mode. 

The New 2DS XL received positive reviews, with critics noting that it combined traits of the 2DS and New Nintendo 3DS XL into a more ergonomic and aesthetically-pleasing device over the slate-shaped 2DS, but noting slight regressions in display and speaker quality.

History
Nintendo has presented versions of the console in black with blue accents for the North American market, and white with orange-gold accents for the Japanese, South Korean and PAL region market, as well as a Japan-exclusive Dragon Quest XI limited edition. Later, the White + Orange variant came to North America, as well as Lavender + White, Black + Green (both Japan-exclusive) as well as Poké Ball and Pikachu variants to coincide with the launch of Pokémon Ultra Sun and Ultra Moon (the former also coming to that region).

In July 2018, a "Hylian Shield" variant was released as a GameStop exclusive in North America, bundled with a pre-installed copy of The Legend of Zelda: A Link Between Worlds. This came alongside an Animal Crossing: New Leaf variant for Europe and Japan, and red/black Mario Kart 7 and Minecraft Creeper styles exclusive to Europe.

A month later, in August, Nintendo announced a new version of the console in purple with silver accents, which would release in September 2018.  Additionally, Nintendo confirmed that all future shipments of the Black + Blue, White + Orange and Purple + Silver models would come with a pre-installed copy of Mario Kart 7.

As of 17 September 2020, the New 2DS XL and all other remaining models in the 3DS family have been discontinued by Nintendo.

Software and services 

The system software of the New Nintendo 2DS XL is otherwise identical to that of the New Nintendo 3DS, remaining compatible with all games released for the 3DS (in two-dimensional mode only), DSi (including games with 3DS enhancements), DS (excluding those requiring the Game Boy Advance cartridge slot), and New Nintendo 3DS (such as Xenoblade Chronicles 3D and Fire Emblem Warriors), and offering online features such as Nintendo Network for multiplayer and online gaming, Nintendo eShop for downloading and purchasing games, and SpotPass and StreetPass.

Reception
IGN considered the New 2DS XL to be an improvement over the "ugly doorstop-like" 2DS, praising its incorporation of features from the New 3DS XL into a device with a thinner and more "comfortable" form factor. Other changes were noted, such as using flaps to protect the game and SD card slots (the latter also removing the need to use tools to access it), and better-feeling shoulder buttons than the New 3DS XL. Regressions were also noted, however, such as its screens having a "washed out" appearance and lacking contrast, the top screen having a mirror-like coat that diminished viewing angles, the speakers sounding "muffled", and the short length of the included stylus. The New 2DS XL was recommended for users who did not need 3D but still wanted to play the platform's exclusive titles.

TechRadar was similarly positive, but also noting that the hinge now protruded from the back of the device (thus making it look less streamlined when closed), its battery life was "underwhelming", and the timing of its launch was at odds with the release of Nintendo Switch.

Notes

References 

Handheld game consoles
 
Products introduced in 2017
Products and services discontinued in 2020
Backward-compatible video game consoles
2010s toys
Eighth-generation video game consoles